Euchaetes polingi is a moth of the family Erebidae. It was described by Samuel E. Cassino in 1928. It is found in the US states of Arizona, New Mexico, Oklahoma and Texas.

References

Phaegopterina
Moths described in 1928